The 2016 Tipperary Senior Football Championship was the 126th edition of the Tipperary GAA's premier club Gaelic football tournament for senior graded teams in County Tipperary, Ireland. The tournament consisted of 16 teams (15 clubs and 1 divisional side) with the winner going on to represent Tipperary in the Munster Senior Club Football Championship. The championship began with a Group stage before proceeding to a knock-out format.

Clonmel Commercials were the defending champions after they defeated Moyle Rovers in the previous years final, however they relinquished their crown to Loughmore-Castleiney at the Semi-Final stage this season.

This was Upperchurch-Drombanes return to the senior grade after claiming the 2015 Tipperary Intermediate Football Championship title.

Loughmore-Castleiney won the title after a 1-9 to 1-6 win against Moyle Rovers in the final on 30 October. It was their third county senior football title in four years.

Thomas McDonaghs were relegated to the 2017 IFC at the end of the season after conceding a walkover for each of their fixtures.

Team Changes
The following teams have changed division since the 2015 championship season.

To S.F.C.
Promoted from I.F.C.
 Upperchurch-Drombane  -  (Intermediate Champions)

From S.F.C.
Relegated to I.F.C.
 Moycarkey-Borris

Group stage 
	

All 16 teams enter the competition at this stage. The top 2 teams in each group go into the Quarter-Finals while the bottom team of each group will enter a Relegation Playoff.

Group A

Round 1
 Aherlow Gaels 0-10, 0-9 Moyle Rovers, 16/4/2016,
 Drom & Inch 1-12, 0-8 Ardfinnan, 16/4/2016,

Round 2
 Drom & Inch 2-11, 0-12 Aherlow Gaels, 30/4/2016,
 Moyle Rovers 2-11, 1-5 Ardfinnan, 30/4/2016,

Round 3
 Aherlow Gaels 3-9, 1-7 Ardfinnan, 24/8/2016,
 Moyle Rovers 0-15, 0-10 Drom & Inch, 24/8/2016, 

Quarter-Final Playoff:
 Aherlow Gaels 1-15, 0-7 Drom & Inch, 5/10/2016,

Group B

Round 1
 Ballyporeen 1-10, 0-10 JK Brackens, 16/4/2016,
 Clonmel Commercials 2-14, 1-6 Killenaule, 16/4/2016,

Round 2
 Clonmel Commercials 0-14, 0-6 JK Brackens, 30/4/2016,
 Ballyporeen 1-11, 0-6 Killenaule, 30/4/2016,

Round 3
 Clonmel Commercials 3-11, 0-7 Ballyporeen, 1/9/2016, 
 JK Brackens -vs- Killenaule,

Group C

Round 1
 Éire Óg Annacarty w/o, scr Thomas MacDonaghs, 17/4/2016,
 Loughmore-Castleiney 0-7, 0-6 Galtee Rovers, 17/4/2016,

Round 2
 Loughmore-Castleiney w/o, scr Thomas MacDonagh's, 30/4/2016,
  Galtee Rovers 2-10, 0-7 Éire Óg Annacarty, 30/4/2016,

Round 3
 Loughmore-Castleiney 1-16, 0-7 Éire Óg Annacarty, 14/9/2016, 
 Galtee Rovers w/o, scr Thomas MacDonagh's, 14/9/2016,

Group D

Round 1
 Arravale Rovers 1-14, 3-8 Kilsheelan-Kiilcash, 16/4/2016,
 Cahir 2-11, 0-13 Upperchurch-Drombane, 16/4/2016,

Round 2
 Arravale Rovers 1-9, 1-6 Upperchurch-Drombane, 29/4/2016,
 Kilsheelan-Kilcash 1-11, 1-7 Cahir, 1/5/2016,

Round 3
 Arravale Rovers 2-15, 0-11 Cahir, 24/8/2016, 
 Kilsheelan-Kilcash 1-18, 1-10 Upperchurch-Drombane, 24/8/2016,

Knockout stage

Quarter finals

Semi finals

Final

References

External links
Tipperary GAA Official Site

Tipperary Senior Football Championship
Tipperary Senior Football Championship